Corydon Township may refer to the following townships in the United States:

 Corydon Township, Wayne County, Iowa 
 Corydon Township, McKean County, Pennsylvania
 Corydon Township, Warren County, Pennsylvania